Balaze may refer to:
 Baláže, a village of Slovakia
 Balazé, a commune in Brittany, France